The 1990–91 B Group was the thirty-fifth season of the Bulgarian B Football Group, the second tier of the Bulgarian football league system. A total of 19 teams contested the league.

Hebar Pazardzhik sealed an instant return to the A Group by sealing the B Group title. Dobrudzha Dobrich returned to the elite after twenty-two seasons away as runners-up.

League table

Top scorers

References

External links 
 1990–91 Bulgarian B Group season

1990-91
Bul
2